Tauschia is a genus of flowering plants in the carrot family which are known as umbrellaworts. These are perennial plants with taproots or tubers and foliage generally resembling that of relatives parsley and carrot. Tauschia are native to the Americas.

Selected species:
Tauschia arguta – southern umbrellawort
Tauschia glauca – glaucus umbrellawort
Tauschia hartwegii – Hartweg's umbrellawort
Tauschia howellii – Howell's umbrellawort
Tauschia kelloggii – Kellogg's umbrellawort
Tauschia parishii – Parish's umbrellawort
Tauschia stricklandii – Strickland's umbrellawort
Tauschia tenuissima – Leiberg's umbrellawort
Tauschia texana – Texas umbrellawort

References

External links 
 Jepson Manual Treatment

Apioideae
Apioideae genera